Susan Sherwin  (born 6 June 1947) is a Canadian philosopher. Her pioneering work has shaped feminist theory, ethics and bioethics, and she is considered one of the world's foremost feminist ethicists.

Education
Sherwin received a B.A. (Hons.) in mathematics and philosophy from York University (1969) and a Ph.D. in philosophy from Stanford University (1974). Her dissertation, “Moral Foundations of Feminism”, was written under the supervision of Thomas Schwartz, and was the first dissertation in the United States on feminist ethics. Sherwin also completed a post-doctoral fellowship in the Moral Problems of Medicine Project at Case Western Reserve University (1973–1974).

Career
Sherwin arrived at Dalhousie University in 1974 as the Department of Philosophy's first female faculty member, later becoming the department's first female chair; she was also an architect of Dalhousie's Gender and Women's Studies program, twice serving as its coordinator. She also was a founding member of the Dalhousie Women Faculty Organization. She served on the Board of Directors of Halifax Transition House, was part of the first equity committee of the Canadian Philosophical Association, and was a founding member of the Canadian Society for Women in Philosophy. Throughout her career at Dalhousie, Sherwin advocated for reform of the university's hiring practices in order to diversify the higher ranks with more women and minorities in positions of power.

Sherwin joined the executive of the Dalhousie Faculty Association in 1974, and in this capacity helped start a certification drive for form a trade union for faculty (with the exception of clinical medicine). She was appointed to the negotiating team that drafted and bargained for the union's first collective agreement. She was elected the first female President of the DFA, and the agreement was concluded during her term.

Work
Sherwin's graduate training began in the logic and philosophy of mathematics, but quickly evolved into health care ethics and feminist philosophy. In the mid-1980s, she combined these two areas of research to consider the implications of a distinctively feminist approach to bioethics. Sherwin's groundbreaking 1992 book, No Longer Patient: Feminist Ethics and Health Care, was the first book-length treatment of feminist bioethical theory, and “the first book that combined feminist philosophy with health care ethics to examine contemporary health issues through a feminist lens”. Considered a “landmark event in bioethics”, No Longer Patient is credited with helping define the field of feminist bioethics. 

The Politics of Women's Health: Exploring Agency and Autonomy (1998), a co-authored volume that Sherwin coordinated, has been described as "an examination of both the real world of women's health status and health-care delivery in different countries, and the assumptions behind the dominant medical model of solving problems without regard to social conditions". It has received praise as "an excellent, insightful book" with themes including "those of autonomy and agency and the prevalent trend in modern healthcare of concentrating on the patient while ignoring his or her economic and social milieu." Some of this work culminated in recommendations that informed Canada's Tri-Council Policy Statement on Ethical Research Involving Humans. 

Sherwin was also involved in establishing the International Journal of Feminist Approaches to Bioethics, and wrote the lead essay for its inaugural issue.

Awards and honors
On 6 May 2015, Sherwin was appointed to the Order of Canada by Governor General David Johnston “for her contributions as a scholar, mentor and leader in the field of feminist bioethics, notably through her writings on discrimination in health care.” Other honours include:
 Doctor of Laws, honoris causa, Dalhousie University, 2017
 Fellow, Canadian Academy of Health Sciences, 2007
 Lifetime Achievement Award, Canadian Bioethics Society, 2007
 Killam Prize in Humanities, 2006
 Distinguished Woman Philosopher, Society for Women in Philosophy, 2004
 Sarah Shorten Award, Canadian Association of University Teachers, 2000
 Fellow, Royal Society of Canada, 1999
 George Munro Professor of Philosophy (Metaphysics), 1999-2002
 President, Dalhousie Faculty Association, 1979-1980

References 

Canadian women philosophers
Canadian ethicists
1947 births
Living people
21st-century Canadian women writers
20th-century Canadian philosophers
20th-century Canadian women writers
Fellows of the Royal Society of Canada
Fellows of the Canadian Academy of Health Sciences
Members of the Order of Canada
Stanford University alumni
Academic staff of the Dalhousie University
York University alumni